Archery GB is the largest national governing body for the sport of archery in the United Kingdom. Archery GB is responsible for all levels of archery within the UK from elite to development level and supports over 40,000 members. Archery GB is the umbrella organisation for English Archery Association, Archery Northern Ireland, Scottish Archery and Welsh Archery Association. Under Archery GB are eight Regional Societies and many different county societies. It is affiliated to the World Archery Federation (WA); (formerly FITA, the Fédération Internationale de Tir à l'Arc) and is a member of the British Olympic Association. The society's motto is: "Union, Trueheart and Courtesie".

Archery GB is the trading name of the Grand National Archery Society, a company limited by guarantee no. 1342150 Registered in England

Role 
Archery GB, is the largest archery organisation of target archery in the United Kingdom, the society also covers either forms of archery including field archery, flight archery and Clout archery.

The society is currently responsible for over 750 clubs and 28,000 registered members across the UK, all of whom may receive the magazine Archery UK four times a year, included in their affiliation. It also organises its own national tournaments and is responsible for training coaches, as well as ensuring affiliated clubs are covered by their public liability insurance policy. These costs are partly covered by affiliation fees, which all club members pay, both to county and regional associations and Archery GB itself.

History 
The first Grand National Archery Meeting was held on the Knavesmire at York in 1843 but the Grand National Archery Society (later Archery GB) itself was not founded until 1861, when it met at the Adelphi Hotel in Liverpool. It confined its early activities to organising the Annual National Championships, being at that time just one of many archery Societies; and it did not become the governing body for the UK until much later. Following this, it became mandatory – rather than optional – for every archer who wished to enter a competition or shoot at a club to become a GNAS member for insurance purposes, and administration was through clubs, counties and regions.

Three older and historically important societies – all of which survive today – were the Royal Toxophilites (founded in 1781), the Woodmen of Arden (founded in 1785), and the Royal Company of Archers (founded in 1676). They are independent of the GNAS, although some members may belong to both.

With archery now firmly established in the Olympics, GNAS/Archery GB has seen many international successes and British archers have won a total of 4 medals since the restoration of the sport in the 1972 Olympic Games.

Rebranding as Archery GB 

At the Annual General Meeting held at Lilleshall on 19 April 2008, an official announcement was made confirming that "Archery GB" would become the trading name of the GNAS. An item in the Summer 2008 edition of Archery UK, the official GNAS magazine, states:

References

External links
 Official website

Archery in the United Kingdom
Archery organizations
Organisations based in Shropshire
Great Britain
Archery
Telford and Wrekin
1861 establishments in the United Kingdom